Watson Peak, is a  mountain in the Solitude Range of the Hart Ranges in Northern British Columbia.

Named for Canadian Army Private John G. Watson, from Bessborough, northwest of Dawson Creek, BC.  Private Watson served with the Seaforth Highlanders when he was killed in action 17 September 1944, age 23 in Italy. Pte. Watson is buried at Coriano Ridge War Cemetery.

References 

Mountain ranges of British Columbia
Northern Interior of British Columbia
Canadian Army soldiers
Dawson Creek